National Route 300 is a national highway of Japan connecting Fujiyoshida and Minobu in Yamanashi prefecture, with a total length of 48.2 km (29.95 mi).

References

National highways in Japan
Roads in Yamanashi Prefecture